The Forbes 400 or 400 Richest Americans is a list published by Forbes magazine of the wealthiest 400 American citizens who own assets in the U.S., ranked by net worth. The 400 was started by Malcolm Forbes in 1982 and the list is published annually around September. Peter W. Bernstein and Annalyn Swan describe the Forbes 400 as capturing "a period of extraordinary individual and entrepreneurial energy, a time unlike the extended postwar years, from 1945 to 1982, when American society emphasized the power of corporations." Bernstein and Swan also describe it as representing "a powerful argument – and sometimes a dream – about the social value of wealth in contemporary America."

Inherited wealth may help explain why many Americans who have become rich may have had a "substantial head start". In September 2012, according to the Institute for Policy Studies, "over 60 percent" of the Forbes richest 400 Americans "grew up in substantial privilege".

Criteria
The Forbes 400 is a report of who has the most wealth in the United States. They annually create a list of the richest people in America to exhibit the shape of the economy. The magazine displays the story of someone's rise to fame, their company, age, industrial residence, and education. The list portrays the financial shift of trends, leadership positions, and growing philanthropy intentions.

First list (1982)
In the first Forbes 400 list, there were only 13 billionaires, and a net worth of  million secured a spot on the list. The 1982 list represented 2.8% of the Gross Domestic Product of the United States. The 1982 Forbes 400 had 22.8% of the list composed of oil fortunes, with 15.3% from manufacturing, 9% from finance and only 3% from technology-driven fortunes. The state of New York had the most representation on the list with 77 members, followed by California with 48.

2000
In the year 2000, Forbes 400 saw the highest percent of the gross domestic product represented by the list at 12.2% driven by the internet boom.

Controversies
In April 2018, an ex-Forbes reporter Jonathan Greenberg alleged that Donald Trump had inflated his actual wealth in order to be included on the Forbes 400 listing. Greenberg provided original audio recordings of his 1984 exchange with "John Barron", one of the pseudonyms of Donald Trump, and eventually included Trump at the end of the Forbes 400 list at $100 million, one fifth of the $500 million which "Barron" was claiming as Donald Trump's net worth. This figure was later corrected and, following civil proceedings years later, Trump admitted the name was fabricated.

Demographics
Over the first 25 years of the Forbes 400 list, 1,302 distinct people made the list. In that time period, 97 immigrants (7.5%) and 202 women (15.5%) made the list. Four of the top five richest people in the United States in 2006 were college dropouts: Bill Gates, Sheldon Adelson, Larry Ellison, and Paul Allen.

A few articles draw on the Forbes 400 to test an evolutionary hypothesis called the Trivers–Willard hypothesis. This hypothesis predicts that parents of high socioeconomic status produce more male offspring than parents of lower socioeconomic status. Whereas a 2009 study using data on the Forbes 400 shows a strong effect for U.S. billionaires that is consistent with the Trivers–Willard hypothesis, a 2013 study shows some caveats: First, the result is only consistent for male, but not female, billionaires. Second, it can only be found among heirs and not self-made billionaires.

This has to do with the timing of wealth accumulation: some self-made billionaires had their children before they were rich, but heirs, by definition, were rich before ever becoming parents (see also ). Third, the size of the effect was largely overestimated, given that the male offspring of billionaires as compared to female offspring is easier to find on the Web: Women sometimes change their last name upon marriage which makes some harder to find. Therefore, earlier reports on the male bias among billionaire offspring were partially an artifact of sample selection.

In 2010, a Business Insider ethnic-demographic breakdown of the Forbes 400 richest Americans found three gay people, four Asian Indians, six (non-Indian) Asians, and 34 women on the list. American Jews made up as many as 30% of the richest 100, and (in 2009) 139 of the Forbes 400. In 2017, just two African Americans made the Forbes 400: media proprietor Oprah Winfrey and tech investor Robert Smith; only five of the Forbes 400 have Latino backgrounds.

See also
 40 Under 40 (Fortune magazine)
 Sunday Times Rich List
 List of Americans by net worth
 List of richest Americans in history

References

External links
 Official website (updated in September 2021)

1982 establishments in the United States
Lists of people by magazine appearance
 400
High society (social class)
Lists of American people
Wealth in the United States